Events from the year 1410 in France

Incumbents
 Monarch – Charles VI

Events
 Unknown – Construction is completed on the Château-Gaillard in Vannes

Births

Deaths
 10 August – Louis II, Duke of Bourbon (born 1337)

References

1410s in France